Bni Ahmed Imoukzan is a small town and rural commune in Al Hoceïma Province of the Taza-Al Hoceima-Taounate region of Morocco. At the time of the 2004 census, the commune had a total population of 8949 people living in 1355 households.

References

Populated places in Al Hoceïma Province
Rural communes of Tanger-Tetouan-Al Hoceima